Blatherwick is a surname. Notable people with the surname include:

David Blatherwick (artist) (born 1960), Canadian painter and video artist
David Blatherwick (diplomat) (born 1941), British diplomat
Francis John Blatherwick (born 1944), Canadian medical health officer
Jack Blatherwick (born 1998), English cricketer
Lily Blatherwick (1854–1934), English painter
Sam Blatherwick (1888–1975), British swimmer
Steve Blatherwick (born 1973), English footballer
Thomas Blatherwick, English rugby player
Wilfred Blatherwick (1870–1956), American tennis player

See also
Hugill & Blatherwick, architectural firm in Sioux Falls, South Dakota
Blatherwycke, village in Northamptonshire, England
Bathwick